A. P. W. Kennan House is a historic home located at Huntington Bay in Suffolk County, New York. It was built about 1900 and is a large, -story, "L"-shaped, shingled, hip-roofed dwelling. It features a gable-roofed pavilion on the east side and a massive second floor Palladian window. It is representative of the Colonial Revival style. Also on the property is the building containing the original garage / servant's quarters.

It was added to the National Register of Historic Places in 1985.

References

Houses on the National Register of Historic Places in New York (state)
Colonial Revival architecture in New York (state)
Houses completed in 1900
Houses in Suffolk County, New York
National Register of Historic Places in Suffolk County, New York
1900 establishments in New York (state)